The 1967 San Diego State Aztecs football team represented San Diego State College during the 1967 NCAA College Division football season.

This was San Diego State's last year in the California Collegiate Athletic Association (CCAA). They had been a member of the CCAA since its founding in 1939. The team was led by head coach Don Coryell, in his seventh year, and played home games at San Diego Stadium in San Diego, California. This was the first season for the Aztecs in the brand new stadium.

They finished the season as champions of the CCAA, with ten wins and one loss (10–1, 5–0 CCAA). The offense scored 319 points during the season, while the defense only gave up 135. For the second season in a row, the Aztecs finished the season ranked number 1 in both the AP Small College Football Poll and the UPI Small College Football Poll. At the end of the regular season, San Diego State again qualified for the Camellia Bowl, which at the time was the Western Regional Final in the College Division of the NCAA. The Aztecs beat San Francisco State in the game, 27–6. The Aztecs were voted the College Division national champion for the second consecutive year. See also: NCAA Division II Football Championship

Schedule

Team players in the NFL/AFL
Four Aztecs were selected in the 1968 NFL/AFL draft.

The following finished their San Diego State career in 1967, were not drafted, but played in the NFL/AFL.

Team awards

Notes

References

San Diego State
San Diego State Aztecs football seasons
NCAA Small College Football Champions
California Collegiate Athletic Association football champion seasons
San Diego State Aztecs football